According to the Evidence is a 1954 comedy crime novel by the British writer Henry Cecil. An ex-army officer and a former criminal join forces to make sure that the man who killed a murderer is acquitted of murder himself.

In 1967, it was adapted into a successful play of the same title by Cecil, Felicity Douglas and Basil Dawson, who had previously co-written another hit adaptation of his novel Alibi for a Judge. This ran for 260 performances at the Savoy Theatre in London's West End. The cast included Douglas Wilmer, Muriel Pavlow, Naunton Wayne and Richard Warner.

References

Bibliography
 Kabatchnik, Amnon. Blood on the Stage, 1950-1975: Milestone Plays of Crime, Mystery, and Detection. Scarecrow Press, 2011.
 Reilly, John M. Twentieth Century Crime & Mystery Writers. Springer, 2015.

1954 British novels
Novels by Henry Cecil
Novels set in London
British comedy novels
British novels adapted into plays
Chapman & Hall books